A woman-owned business is a specific designation used by American government agencies and industry associations to set aside special programs to encourage and empower female business owners. Most definitions of this term involve a practical look at the legal and ownership structure, as well as the issue of control of the day-to-day operations of a business. The consideration of control of a business is meant to discourage the practice of men placing wives, daughters, or low-level female employees in positions of ownership, when in fact she may have little to do with the day-to-day management of the company, for the sake of receiving some government benefits or other consideration.

A Woman-Owned Business Enterprise (WBE) is defined as one that is at least 51% owned, operated and controlled on a daily basis by one or more female American citizens. WBEs are typically certified by a third-party, city, state or federal agency. The Small Business Administration offers a similar definition of a Women-Owned Small Business (WOSB) as a small business that is at least 51% owned, operated and controlled on a daily basis by one or more (in combination) female American citizens. The SBA's WOSB definition differentiates from the WBE definition, as it looks at the size of the business according to the specific industry standards table.

Support for woman business owners 
Research shows that in most countries there are significant challenges for women business owners in comparison to men business owners. These challenges stem from many sources, including social and cultural stigmas, family and child-rearing responsibilities, maternity needs, educational background, career experience, and community support. Depending on the country in which a woman resides and/or is a citizen, there may be government or non-profit support for female business owners.

There are several U.S. organizations that provide third-party women-owned certifications and support including: U.S. Women's Chamber of Commerce, The SHE Mark, Women's Business Enterprise National Council (WBENC), California Public Utilities Commission, Women's Business Entrepreneur Council (WBE council),  and National Women Business Owners Corporation. 

National initiatives to support the growth of women's business ownership include Prowess in the UK. In India, supporting groups include WeConnect, WEI, and some specific bank-sponsored loan schemes. In Europe, the Entrepreneurship 2020 Action Plan is aimed at supporting women business owners, among other initiatives.

United States federal contracts
There are specific set-aside programs for certain NAICS codes in which certified WOSBs (or in some cases Economically Disadvantaged Women-Owned Small Businesses (EDWOSB), a subcategory of WOSB) may receive special consideration in a U.S. government contract. According to  OpenSecrets, the Federal government of the United States gave $25.4 billion in federal contracts to women-owned businesses in 2017, this was 5 percent of the total budget in the fiscal year. This was up from 3.25 percent of contracts in fiscal year 2008.

"Women Owned" in marketing

Some companies have deemed it to be beneficial to advertise that the business is primarily or exclusively owned by woman as part of an additional benefit for consumers to do business with the "Woman Owned" business and buy the goods or services of the business. Some businesses as a result of this thinking, advertise prominently on packaging of products or of services to be rendered that the business is "Woman Owned" or "Women Owned", or some other similar wording.

See also
 Minority business enterprise

References

Procurement
Businesswomen